The Women's 50 metre rifle prone event was held on 28 July 2014 at the Barry Buddon Shooting Centre.

Results

References

External links
Schedule

Shooting at the 2014 Commonwealth Games
Common